The Masonic Temple in the Fisherville neighborhood of Louisville, Kentucky is a historic building from at least 1852. It was listed on the National Register of Historic Places in 1983.

Originally the building was jointly owned and used by two Religious denominations (the Fisherville Christian Church, and the Fisherville Baptist Church) and the local Masonic lodge (Philip Swigert Lodge No. 218). The Christian Church sold its shares to the Baptist Church in 1881.  The Masons and the Baptist Church continued to share the premises until 1951, when the Baptist congregation sold its share to the lodge.  In 1975 the Masons moved to a new building and sold the property. It is now in private hands.

It appears that the building has been destroyed.

References

Former Masonic buildings in Kentucky
Masonic buildings completed in 1852
Churches completed in 1852
Former churches in Kentucky
Clubhouses on the National Register of Historic Places in Kentucky
National Register of Historic Places in Louisville, Kentucky
19th-century buildings and structures in Louisville, Kentucky
1852 establishments in Kentucky
Former buildings and structures in Kentucky
Demolished but still listed on the National Register of Historic Places